On the Nickel is a 1980 feature film written, produced by, and starring Ralph Waite. It features five original songs composed for the movie by Tom Waits.

The film presents the story of Sam (Donald Moffat), a recovering alcoholic who feels dissatisfied with his life of sobriety and goes back in search of the good times he enjoyed with his old friends living on Los Angeles' skid row. (This includes a section of Fifth Street, which is sometimes called "the Nickel", after the five-cent coin.) Eventually finding his best friend, "C.G." (Waite), still living on the nickel, the two men reminisce, and Sam gets a fresh look at the lifestyle he had once vigorously abandoned. The film is a multi-level odyssey through the slums of L.A., as well as Sam's personal ruminations as he re-evaluates the nostalgia he had felt for the free and bohemian lifestyle of a street person.

The film also stars Hal Williams, Penelope Allen, and Jack Kehoe. The original soundtrack was written and performed by Tom Waits. With its offbeat, comedic depiction of life on the streets, the film has maintained a cult following since its initial release, although it passed out of general availability for 20 years and effectively became a "lost" movie. Despite this, occasional showings on American television have kept viewer interest high and have resulted in Mr. Waite's decision to collaborate with producer Thomas Wise, re-edit and restore the feature for DVD and internet release in late 2009. On the Nickel debuted on Blu Ray disc in 2017. Discs are currently mastered in Germany and imported to the U.S. and North America. They are compatible with players in the U.S., Central and South America, Canada, and most of Asia.

References

External links

Official "On the Nickel" site

1980 films
American drama films
1980 drama films
1980s English-language films
1980s American films